Bella Vista is located 33 kilometres north-west of the Sydney central business district and is part of The Hills Shire. It is a suburb in the Hills District of Greater Western Sydney and is in the state of New South Wales, Australia. Bella Vista’s Norwest Business Park is home to several Fortune 500 companies, a number of shopping centres, high-rise buildings, and industrial and recreational spaces.

History

In 1799 Joseph Foveaux was granted  which, in addition to other purchases, he sold to John Macarthur in 1801. John and Elizabeth Macarthur farmed sheep on this property in addition to their properties at Camden and Parramatta. For much of the time that the Macarthurs owned this farm John was overseas and it fell to Elizabeth to manage the various Macarthur properties and flocks. During this time reference is made by her to "my Seven Hills Farm".

Although claims are made by some that the Seven Hills Farm was used exclusively by the Macarthurs for the breeding of their merino flocks, this is clearly not the case as the documentary evidence of the Macarthur papers shows that their Merino rams were paddocked at Elizabeth Farm at Parramatta. The Seven Hills farm was isolated and stock there were always in danger from theft and aboriginal attack. Two of Macarthur's stockmen were killed on the farm by natives in 1805. In fact the sheep at the Macarthur's Seven Hills farm had their genesis in the 600 sheep which were purchased from Foveaux at the same time as the property. What can justifiably be claimed about the site is that it was one of the first major Australian sheep breeding farms and that the results later achieved at Camden with fine merino sheep only followed Elizabeth's efforts at Seven Hills. Part of this land was later acquired by the Pearce family and became known as Bella Vista.

All the buildings on the site today date from this period of its history with no extant buildings from the Macarthur period. In the 1890s, Edward Henry Pearce (1839–1912) of Bella Vista was declared the "largest and most successful orange grower in the colony." Bella Vista was sold by the Pearce family in 1950.

Until the mid-1990s, the area was primarily used for small-scale agriculture. Since then, significant changes have become apparent as it incorporates a residential area and a busy business district. However, the homestead and old farm buildings have been preserved and this portion of the former Pearce family property is now owned by The Hills Shire Council. The Friends of Bella Vista Farm Park has been formed and they are working actively to achieve the continued restoration of all buildings on this unique site.

Heritage listings 
Bella Vista has a number of heritage-listed sites, including:
 Elizabeth Macarthur Drive: Bella Vista (homestead)
Seven Hills Road: Pearce Family Cemetery

Demographics
The most common countries of birth who weren’t born in Australia were, India 7.6%, China 5.9%, Sri Lanka 4.3%, England 2.3% and the Philippines 2.1%. 49.0% of residents spoke only English at home. Other languages spoken at home included Mandarin 8.6%, Hindi 4.5%, Tamil 4.5%, Cantonese 4.4% and Punjabi 2.6%. The most common responses for religious affiliation were Catholic 24.8%, No Religion 18.0%, Hinduism 12.6%, Anglican 9.1% and Pentecostal 5.8%.

Commercial area
The suburb has shopping complexes and a major hotel. It is rapidly becoming the main business centre within the Hills District. The biggest commercial area is the Norwest Business Park on Norwest Boulevard to the east. Norwest Business Park incorporates retail, commercial, industrial and hotel developments. The industrial areas in West Bella Vista are still heavily under development, with many new warehouses appearing recently.

Health services
Bella Vista has numerous established medical centres and dental surgeries, including Norwest Private Hospital on Norbrik Drive, and Hospital for Specialist Surgery located on Solent Circuit.

Shopping centres
Circa Retail is a shopping centre located near Old Windsor Road, featuring a Woolworths supermarket as the anchor tenant with 25 specialty stores.

Corporate hub
In 2006, Woolworths, a public Australian retail company, joined all of its sub-management offices into a $200 million complex in Norwest Business Park in Bella Vista. The move meant Bella Vista was listed in Fortune's Global 500 list as one of the suburbs (Bella Vista is a suburb of Sydney) where Global 500 companies have their headquarters, ranked above Singapore, Miami and Baltimore and alongside Bangkok and Boston.

Other large scale corporations with their headquarters in the Norwest Business Park include Homeart, ResMed and AAMI and the Reserve Bank of Australia.

Transport
A major factor in the recent growth of Bella Vista has been its prime location near the end of the Sydney M2 motorway. The motorway (opened in 1997) means that in very good traffic conditions it takes just over half an hour to get from Bella Vista to the CBD. This also puts Bella Vista close to two major north–south transport routes through Sydney, the Cumberland Highway and the Westlink M7.

Until the completion of the Sydney Metro Northwest buses were the only form of public transport available to Bella Vista residents. The suburb is serviced by private bus companies Hillsbus and Busways. Relatively frequent buses connect Bella Vista with the nearby hubs of Parramatta (bus numbers 662, 663, 664 and 665), Castle Hill (bus numbers 730, 660 and 662), Blacktown (bus number 730) and Seven Hills (bus numbers 714 and 715). There are also peak services available directly to North Sydney (602X) and the CBD (bus numbers 607X, 613X, and 614X). Many routes use the North-West T-way.

Two railway stations now service the area. Bella Vista railway station is located on the corner of Lexington Drive and Old Windsor Road, whilst Norwest railway station is located in the suburb of Norwest near Hillsong Church across the road from the Norwest Market town shopping centre. The Sydney Metro Northwest is now the main public transport line linking residents of north-western Sydney with Epping, Chatswood, North Sydney and the Sydney CBD. It has also improved access to Castle Hill, Norwest Business Park and Rouse Hill.

Education
Bella Vista is close to many educational institutions including:
 Bella Vista Public School
 Baulkham Hills High School
 Crestwood High School
 Crestwood Public School
 Gilroy Catholic College
 Glenwood High School
 Hillsong Church operates the Hillsong International Leadership College
 Matthew Pearce Public School
 Model Farms High School
 St Michael's Primary School

Churches
Nearby churches include:
 Hillsong Church, located in Norwest Business Park
 Norwest Anglican Church
 St Michael's Catholic Church in Baulkham Hills

References

External links
 Bella vista farm park

 
Suburbs of Sydney
The Hills Shire